Nezir is a Turkish masculine given name. It may refer to:

Nezir Karap (born 1994), Turkish swimmer
Nezir Sağır (born 1983), Turkish weightlifter 
Nezir Škaljić (1844–1905), Bosnian politician and Mayor of Sarajevo

See also
Neziri, people with the surname
Nəzirli, a village and municipality in the Barda Rayon of Azerbaijan.

Turkish masculine given names